T.I.'s Road To Redemption is an American reality television show that premiered on February 10, 2009, on MTV. The show was produced by T.I., Michael Hirschorn, Stella Stolper and Chris Choun of Ish Entertainment. The series, focusing on the 45 days before rapper T.I.'s March sentencing, hoped to encourage teenagers to avoid spending a life of crime by showing seven teenagers that there is another way.  In T.I.'s Road to Redemption, T.I. shares the mistakes he has made and the lessons he learned. The show includes events in his personal life such as the birth of his sixth son and the release of his album, Paper Trail.

In 2007, T.I. was convicted of two felony gun charges. He served a sentence of one year and one day behind bars starting March 27, 2009. He was also sentenced to 1500 hours of community service. The series started filming in June 2008 continued until March 2009.

"We visited T.I. early in 2008 while he was under house arrest in Georgia and found a man utterly unlike his rap persona," Stella Stolper and Michael Hirschorn of Ish Entertainment said. "He felt that he was undergoing a karmic reckoning, a time when he would have to balance the scales of his life and integrate who he was with who he is. We've never seen someone so introspective, so smart about how who he was back in the slums of Atlanta is affecting who he is now."

In the last days of filming, the shows star,  T.I. wrote a statement that was published in several news sites. In the statement "Responsibility Is A Lifestyle: It’s Time to Bury Da Beef' T.I. reflected on making bad decisions and thanks key figures in helping with the show and reducing his sentencing. "with many mentors and supporters by my side, including Rev. Al Sharpton, Russell Simmons, Kevin Liles, GlobalGrind.com, Political Swagger, Mobile Regime (Parent company of Nation19) and the C.H.A.N.G.E. Initiative to share the message that now is the time. Now is the time to speak out against gun violence. Now is the time to take responsibility for our actions. Now is the time to make our communities safer."

The title of the show changed depending on how many days were remaining before T.I.'s sentencing (i.e. T.I.'s Road to Redemption: 38 Days to Go, T.I.'s Road to Redemption: 31 Days to Go, T.I.'s Road to Redemption: 1 Day to Go etc.).

Episodes

References

External links 
 T.I.'s Road to Redemption on MTV

MTV original programming
2009 American television series debuts
2009 American television series endings
T.I.